The Richmond Virginians was a major league baseball team that played in the American Association in 1884. The Virginians thereby became the first major league team in the former Confederacy, as well as the last one until the establishment of the Houston Astros in 1962. The Virginians had a record of 12 wins and 30 losses after replacing the Washington Statesmen, who had dropped out of the league. The Virginians were managed by Felix Moses and played their home games in Allen Pasture.

The Virginians began their existence in the Eastern League in 1884. When the Statesmen folded on August 2, the Virginians were brought into the American Association to complete their schedule. They played their first game on August 5 against the Philadelphia Athletics, losing 14-0. They won their first game on August 7, defeating the Brooklyn Atlantics. They finished the season with two losses to the Toledo Blue Stockings to bring their record to 12-30.

After the season, the AA contracted from 12 teams to 8, with the Virginians being one of the eliminated teams. The Virginians returned to the Eastern League, where they played the 1885 season before folding.

See also
1884 Richmond Virginians season

References

American Association (1882–1891) baseball teams
Sports in Richmond, Virginia
Defunct baseball teams in Virginia
1884 establishments in Virginia
1885 disestablishments in Virginia
Baseball teams established in 1884
Sports clubs disestablished in 1885
Baseball teams disestablished in 1885